The 2016–17 Virginia Tech Hokies women's basketball team represented Virginia Polytechnic Institute and State University during the 2016–17 NCAA Division I women's basketball season. The Hokies, led by first year head coach Kenny Brooks, played their home games at Cassell Coliseum and were members of the Atlantic Coast Conference. They finished the season 20–14, 4–12 in ACC play to finish in a tie for eleventh place. They lost in the first round of the ACC women's tournament to Clemson. They were invited to the Women's National Invitation Tournament where they defeated Rider, Navy and Penn State in the first, second and third rounds before losing to Michigan in the quarterfinals.

2016–17 media

Virginia Tech Hokies Sports Network
The Virginia Tech Hokies IMG Sports Network will broadcast Hokies games on WNMX. Andrew Allegretta will provide the call for the games and for select ESPN3 games. All WNMX games and games not on WNMX can be heard online through HokiesXtra.

Roster

Schedule

|-
!colspan=9 style="background:#721227; color:#F77318;"| Non-conference regular season

|-
!colspan=9 style="background:#721227; color:#F77318;"| ACC regular season

|-
!colspan=9 style="background:#721227; color:#F77318;"| ACC Women's Tournament

|-
!colspan=9 style="background:#721227; color:#F77318;"| WNIT

Rankings
2016–17 NCAA Division I women's basketball rankings

See also
 2016–17 Virginia Tech Hokies men's basketball team

References

Virginia Tech
2017 Women's National Invitation Tournament participants
Virginia Tech
Virginia Tech
Virginia Tech Hokies women's basketball seasons